Warren Hogan (born 4 May 1972) is Judo Bank's Chief Economic Advisor. He is also the Managing Director and Founder of EQ Economics.

Warren is a regular in Australian media (e.g. Skynews), as well as a columnist for the Australian Financial Review. His focus is on the Australian economy and supporting business decision making.

Warren previously worked for the NSW Treasury Corporation, Westpac Banking Corporation, Credit Suisse and the ANZ bank as Chief Economist from 2009 - 2016.

His father, Warren Pat Hogan (3 April 1929 – 17 December 2009) was also an Australian economist and educator. He was professor of economics at the University of Sydney from 1968 to 1998.

References

1972 births

Living people